Balazucia is a genus of fungi in the family Laboulbeniaceae. The genus contains two species.

References

External links
Balazucia at Index Fungorum

Laboulbeniomycetes